Gölpazarı District is a district of the Bilecik Province of Turkey. Its seat is the town Gölpazarı. Its area is 670 km2, and its population is 9,031 (2021).

Composition
There is one municipality in Gölpazarı District:
 Gölpazarı

There are 48 villages in Gölpazarı District:

 Akçakavak
 Aktaş
 Alıç
 Arıcaklar
 Armutçuk
 Baltalı
 Bayat
 Bedi
 Bolatlı
 Büyükbelen
 Büyüksürmeli
 Büyüksusuz
 Çengeller
 Çiftlik
 Çımışkı
 Çukurören
 Demirhanlar
 Derecikören
 Dereli
 Doğancılar
 Dokuz
 Gökçeler
 Gökçeözü
 Göldağı
 Gözaçanlar
 Hacıköy
 Hamidiye
 İncirli
 Karaağaç
 Karaahmetler
 Karacalar
 Kasımlar
 Kavak
 Keskin
 Köprücek
 Küçüksusuz
 Küçükyenice
 Kümbet
 Kurşunlu
 Kuşçuören
 Şahinler
 Sarıhacılar
 Softalar
 Söğütcük
 Taşçıahiler
 Tongurlar
 Türkmen
 Üyük

References

Districts of Bilecik Province